There are at least 49 named mountains in Custer County, Montana.
 Angelwing Butte, el. 
 Badland Butte, el. 
 Baldy Butte, el. 
 Baldy Butte, el. 
 Baldy Peak, el. 
 Big Hill, el. 
 Big Peak, el. 
 Blue Mountain, el. 
 Blue Mountains, el. 
 Bracket Butte, el. 
 Buck Mountain, el. 
 Camelsback, el. 
 Carbon Hill, el. 
 Chalk Butte, el. 
 Chimney Butte, el. 
 Corral Butte, el. 
 Dug Long Hill, el. 
 Government Hill, el. 
 Gravel Hill (Montana), el. 
 Green Mountain, el. 
 Harris Buttes, el. 
 Hayes Point, el. 
 Henry Woods Mountain, el. 
 Horse Creek Hill, el. 
 Ingersol Butte, el. 
 Kirkpatrick Hill, el. 
 Loaf of Bread Butte, el. 
 Lookout Butte, el. 
 Maxwell Butte, el. 
 Montague Butte, el. 
 Rattlesnake Butte, el. 
 Red Butte, el. 
 Red Butte, el. 
 Red Knob, el. 
 Saddle Horse Butte, el. 
 Signal Butte, el. 
 Snake Butte, el. 
 Steamboat Butte, el. 
 Strawberry Hill, el. 
 Sundown Butte, location unknown, el. 
 Sunrise Peak, el. 
 Tepee Butte, el. 
 The Knob, el. 
 Tower Butte, el. 
 Twin Buttes, el. 
 Twin Buttes, el. 
 Twin Buttes, el. 
 White Knob, el. 
 Wild Horse Mountain, el.

See also
 List of mountains in Montana
 List of mountain ranges in Montana

Notes

Custer